
This is a list of players who graduated from the Nationwide Tour in 2010. The top 25 players on the Nationwide Tour's money list in 2010 earned their PGA Tour card for 2011.

*PGA Tour rookie in 2011

Green background indicates the player retained his PGA Tour card for 2012 through a win or finish in the top 125 of the money list.
Yellow background indicates the player did not retain his PGA Tour card for 2012, but retained conditional status (finished between 126–150).
Red background indicates the player did not retain his PGA Tour card for 2012 (finished outside the top 150).

Winners on the PGA Tour in 2011

Runners-up on the PGA Tour in 2011

See also
2010 PGA Tour Qualifying School graduates

External links
The final 25: Who earned their 2011 PGA Tour Card
Money list
Player profiles

Korn Ferry Tour
PGA Tour
Nationwide Tour Graduates
Nationwide Tour Graduates